Otoyol 50, abbreviated as O-50, aka Adana Çevreyolu, was the former designation for the  long motorway passing through the city of Adana, Turkey. In the 2014 the KGM resigned the section of motorway west of the Seyhan River as the O-51 and the section west of the Seyhan River as O-52. Thus extending the O-52 and O-51 into central Adana.

It started in the west of Adana at eastern terminus of Adana-Erdemli Motorway O-51, running north of the city, and ending northeast of Adana connecting to Adana-Şanlıurfa Motorway O-52. It was also a part of the European route E90 and the international Asian Highway 84. The Adana Beltway is still a toll-free motorway.

See also
 List of highways in Turkey
 List of Motorways in Turkey

References

Turkey road map
List of exits on O-50

Transport in Adana Province
50